Miss World Panamá 2019 was the 7th Miss World Panamá pageant, held to select Panama's representative to the Miss World pageant. This was the first edition of the renewed Miss World Panama Pageant, after the Miss World organization awarded the license to event producer Edwin Dominguez who had been named the new director of the pageant in 2016.

Seventeen preliminary contestants were selected from all over Panama and competed for the crown. Señorita Panamá World 2018 Solaris De la Luna Barba Cañizales of Herrera crowned Agustina Ruíz of Herrera as her successor at the end of the event.

Agustina Ruíz Miss World Panamá 2019 was to compete in Miss World 2019 on December 14, 2019, at the ExCeL London in London, United Kingdom.

History
Señorita Panamá was created by RPC Channel 4 as an alternative to send its winners to the Miss World contest in London. In 2003 Corporación MEDCOM could not produce a pageant in time to select a representative to Miss World and Promociones Gloria in Bolivia helped selecting a contestant by casting; in 2007  the agency Panama Talents  organized a small contest called Miss World Panamá for 2007, in 2010 Olais Padilla organized a local competition called Miss Mundo Panamá 2010, from 2011 to 2015 the Miss World license was awarded to Marisela Moreno (Miss Panama Organization) with two independent edition (2013 and 2014). In 2016 Miss World awarded the license to event producer Edwin Dominguez, who had an agreement with Señorita Panamá for three years (2016-2018) with two independent edition (2016 and 2017).

Official Contestants 
These are the competitors who have been selected this year.

Candidate notes
Miss World Taboga, Beatriz Victoria Stein, competed in Miss Panamá 2014 as Miss Panama Centro.
Miss World Colón, Nathalie Pino, competed in Señorita Panamá 2019 as Miss Colón where she placed in the Top 12 semi-finalists. She withdrew from the competition after the Top Model competition.
Miss World Panamá Centro, Krysthelle Barreto, competed in Señorita Panamá 2019 as Miss Chiriquí where she placed in the Top 12 semi-finalists.
Miss World Panamá Pacifico, Katherina Rios, competed in Señorita Panamá 2018 as Miss Isla del Rey.
Miss World Coclé, Grace Sarmiento, withdrew from the competition for personal reasons.
Miss World Cristóbal, Litzy Del Cid , withdrew from the competition for personal reasons.

References

Señorita Panamá
2019 beauty pageants
2019 in Panama